María Isabel Vásconez Gomezcoello (born 4 June 1990), known as Mayta Vásconez, is an Ecuadorian footballer who plays as a midfielder for Ups Carneras. She has been a member of the Ecuador women's national team.

Club career
Vásconez played for Spanish Segunda División club UE Sant Andreu from early to mid 2015.

International career
Vásconez played two matches for Ecuador at senior level during the 2014 Copa América Femenina. She retired from international football the next year by not being selected for the 2015 FIFA Women's World Cup despite she was at the time the only female footballer formed in Ecuador who was playing in Europe.

Personal life
Vásconez is mother.

References

1990 births
Living people
Women's association football midfielders
Ecuadorian women's footballers
People from Cuenca, Ecuador
Ecuador women's international footballers
UE Sant Andreu footballers
C.D. Cuenca Femenino players
Ecuadorian expatriate footballers
Ecuadorian expatriate sportspeople in Spain
Expatriate women's footballers in Spain
21st-century Ecuadorian women